North Perrott is a village and civil parish in the South Somerset district of the English county of Somerset.

History

The name Perrott comes from the River Parrett.

There is evidence of Roman and Iron Age settlement in the village.

The manor was held with South Perrott just over the border in Dorset.

The parish was part of the hundred of Houndsborough.

The site with its surrounding moat is believed to be the medieval mansion home of the De Pipplepens.

Governance

The parish council has responsibility for local issues, including setting an annual precept (local rate) to cover the council's operating costs and producing annual accounts for public scrutiny. The parish council evaluates local planning applications and works with the local police, district council officers, and neighbourhood watch groups on matters of crime, security, and traffic. The parish council's role also includes initiating projects for the maintenance and repair of parish facilities, as well as consulting with the district council on the maintenance, repair, and improvement of highways, drainage, footpaths, public transport, and street cleaning. Conservation matters (including trees and listed buildings) and environmental issues are also the responsibility of the council.

The village falls within the Non-metropolitan district of South Somerset, which was formed on 1 April 1974 under the Local Government Act 1972, having previously been part of Yeovil Rural District. The district council is responsible for local planning and building control, local roads, council housing, environmental health, markets and fairs, refuse collection and recycling, cemeteries and crematoria, leisure services, parks, and tourism. North Perrott is part of this electoral ward which is called Parrett. At the 2011 census the population of this ward was 2,336.

Somerset County Council is responsible for running the largest and most expensive local services such as education, social services, libraries, main roads, public transport, policing and fire services, trading standards, waste disposal and strategic planning.

It is also part of the Yeovil county constituency represented in the House of Commons of the Parliament of the United Kingdom. It elects one member of parliament by the first past the post system of election.

Geography

To the east of the village is Whitevine Meadows a biological Site of Special Scientific Interest which consists of a nationally rare type of neutral grassland together with adjoining areas of scrub and ancient woodland. The Whitevine meadow is unusual in being one of only three British localities where the grass Gaudinia fragilis is a prominent and established component of the sward. The scrub provides nest sites for several species of bird, including nightingale (Luscinia megarhynchos). Clearings within the scrub support a mixed flora with saw-wort (Serratula tinctoria), yellow-wort (Blackstonia perfoliata) and autumn gentian (Gentianella amarella). These sheltered glades provide favourable climatic conditions for butterflies including marbled white (Melanargia galathea) and silver-washed fritillary (Argynnis paphia).

Landmarks

North Perrott Manor House was built in 1877 by Thomas Henry Wyatt for P.M. Hoskyns. After World War II it became Perrott Hill School and, along with the ornaments, stables and other outbuildings, has been designated as a listed building.

Religious sites

The Church of St Martin dates from the 12th century and has been designated by English Heritage as a Grade I listed building.

Sport
North Perrott Cricket Club Ground is a former List A cricket ground.  It hosted a single Cheltenham & Gloucester Trophy match in 2001 between Somerset Cricket Board and Wales Minor Counties. The ground has also been used by Somerset County Cricket Club and Board for numerous other matches.  It has also hosted the Somerset women's cricket team occasionally since 2005.  The ground is home to North Perrott Cricket Club, and has been since its creation in 1946.

Notable people
The writer Elizabeth Ham was born in North Perrott in 1783.

References

13. North Perrott Remembered by Leslie Parkman

External links

Villages in South Somerset
Civil parishes in Somerset